This is a list of awards and decorations received by Kim Il-sung, founder and first leader of North Korea. According to North Korean sources, the country awarded him "the title of Hero of the DPRK three times, the title of Labour Hero of the DPRK, 26 orders and 3 medals". In addition, foreign countries and organizations conferred upon him 74 orders and 152 medals.

North Korean

Foreign

See also

Awards and decorations received by Kim Jong-il
Awards and decorations received by Leonid Brezhnev
List of awards and honours bestowed upon Joseph Stalin
List of awards and honours bestowed upon Fidel Castro
List of awards and honours bestowed upon Muammar Gaddafi
Awards and decorations received by Josip Broz Tito
Orders, decorations, and medals of North Korea
List of things named after Kim Il-sung

References

Works cited

Kim Il-sung
Kim, Il-sung